Grigori Konstantinovich Trufanov (born 13 June 1997) is a Russian football player.

Club career
He made his debut in the Russian Football National League for FC Baikal Irkutsk on 12 March 2016 in a game against FC Yenisey Krasnoyarsk.

References

External links
 Profile by Russian Football National League

1997 births
Sportspeople from Irkutsk
Living people
Russian footballers
Association football defenders
FC Baikal Irkutsk players
FC SKA-Khabarovsk players
FC Noah players
FC Nosta Novotroitsk players
Russian First League players
Russian Second League players
Armenian Premier League players
Russian expatriate footballers
Expatriate footballers in Armenia
Russian expatriate sportspeople in Armenia